Boncelles is a town of Wallonia and a district of the municipality of Seraing, located in the province of Liège, Belgium.

The Fort de Boncelles is situated in Boncelles.

Sub-municipalities of Seraing
Former municipalities of Liège Province